The Incredulity of Saint Thomas or the Rockox Triptych (or "Altarpiece"), is a triptych painting by Peter Paul Rubens, produced between 1613 and 1615. It is in the collection of the Royal Museum of Fine Arts Antwerp.

It was commissioned by sir Nicolaas II Rockox and his spouse Adriana Perez, for the Lady Chapel of the Recollects church in Antwerp and he and his wife are shown on its outer panels. Its central panel shows the disbelief of Thomas.

References

External links
http://barokinvlaanderen.vlaamsekunstcollectie.be/nl/collectie/ongeloof-van-tomas-0

1615 paintings
Paintings in the collection of the Royal Museum of Fine Arts Antwerp
Paintings by Peter Paul Rubens
Paintings depicting Jesus
Altarpieces